The 2004 season was the Houston Texans' third in the National Football League, all of which they had spent under head coach Dom Capers. The team finished 7–9, two games better than the previous season, and came third in the AFC South, the first time they had not finished bottom. The Texans also earned their first victory over the Tennessee Titans, the franchise previously known as the Oilers, who had left Houston after the 1996 season.

Quarterback David Carr, who missed four games the previous season, started all 16 games in 2004. Carr finished 2004 as his best season with Houston, finishing 285-of-466 for 3,531 yards with 16 touchdowns and 14 interceptions. Carr's 466 attempts, 3,531 passing yards, and 16 passing touchdowns would all be career highs for him. Additionally, this was the first season Carr finished with more touchdowns than interceptions.

Offseason

NFL draft

Staff

Roster

Preseason

Regular season

Schedule

Note: Intra-division opponents are in bold text.

Game summaries

Week 1: vs. San Diego Chargers

Week 2: at Detroit Lions

Week 3: at Kansas City Chiefs

Week 4: vs. Oakland Raiders

Week 5: vs. Minnesota Vikings

Week 6: at Tennessee Titans

With the win, the Texans improved to 3–3. This was the Texans' first win over the Tennessee Titans, who previously played in Houston as the Oilers from 1960 to 1996.

Week 8: vs. Jacksonville Jaguars

Week 9: at Denver Broncos

Week 10: at Indianapolis Colts

Week 11: vs. Green Bay Packers

Week 12: vs. Tennessee Titans

With the win, the Texans improved to 5–6, snapped their three game losing streak, and swept the Titans for the first time in franchise history.

Week 13: at New York Jets

Week 14: vs. Indianapolis Colts

Week 15: at Chicago Bears

Week 16: at Jacksonville Jaguars

Week 17: vs. Cleveland Browns

Looking to secure their first non-losing season, the 7–8 Texans hosted the 3–12 Browns in the regular season finale of the 2004 season. Despite only committing one turnover, Houston's offense struggled and only gained 238 yards of total offense compared to Cleveland's 364. The Texans scored a touchdown with 1:23 left to trail 14–22 and attempted an onside kick, but it was recovered by the Browns who would run out the clock to win the game.

Standings

Statistics

Team

Individual

Source:

References

Houston Texans seasons
Houston